Hohai University Stadium (Simplified Chinese: 河海大学体育场) is a 5,000-capacity multi-use stadium in Hohai University, Nanjing, China.  It is currently used mostly for football matches.

Footnotes

Football venues in Nanjing
Rugby union stadiums in China
Sports venues in Nanjing
University sports venues in China
Hohai University